Myŏraksan, in English Mt. Myorak, is a mountain on the border of Rinsan and P'yŏngsan counties of North Hwanghae Province in North Korea. It has an elevation of 818 m. A plant reserve of 126 km² was established in that area in 1976. It is one of the few suitable habitats for the Tristram's Woodpecker in the world.

References

External links
Biodiversity Strategy and Action Plan DPRK
 Encyclopedias:  Britannica, Doosan

Mountains of North Korea
North Hwanghae